The 2010–11 season will be Ferencvárosi TC's 108th competitive season, 2nd consecutive season in the Soproni Liga and 111th year in existence as a football club.

Team kit and logo
The team kits for the 2010-11 season are produced by Nike and the shirt sponsor is Fantastic League. The home kit is green and white colour and the away kit is white colour. The third kit is green colour.

Club

Coaching staff

Top scorers
Includes all competitive matches. The list is sorted by shirt number when total goals are equal.

Last updated on 22 May 2011

Disciplinary record
Includes all competitive matches. Players with 1 card or more included only.

Last updated on 22 May 2011

Overall
{|class="wikitable"
|-
|Games played || 38 (30 Soproni Liga, 4 Hungarian Cup and 4 Hungarian League Cup)
|-
|Games won || 19  (15 Soproni Liga, 3 Hungarian Cup and 1 Hungarian League Cup)
|-
|Games drawn ||  8  (5 Soproni Liga, 0 Hungarian Cup and 3 Hungarian League Cup)
|-
|Games lost ||  11  (10 Soproni Liga, 1 Hungarian Cup and 0 Hungarian League Cup)
|-
|Goals scored || 71
|-
|Goals conceded || 51
|-
|Goal difference || +20
|-
|Yellow cards || 81
|-
|Red cards || 5
|-
|rowspan="1"|Worst discipline ||  Marek Heinz (5 , 2 )
|-
|rowspan="1"|Best result || 8–1 (A) v Újbuda TC - Hungarian Cup - 22-09-2010
|-
|rowspan="1"|Worst result || 0–6 (A) v Újpest FC - Nemzeti Bajnokság I - 10-09-2010
|-
|rowspan="1"|Most appearances ||   Csaba Csizmadia (33 appearances)
|-
|rowspan="1"|Top scorer ||  André Schembri (17 goals)
|-
|Points || 65/114 (57.02%)
|-

Nemzeti Bajnokság I

Classification

Results summary

Results by round

Matches

Ferencvárosi TC: Ranilović – Stockley, Csizmadia, Tutoric, Junior – Andrezinho (Abdi 69.), Maróti, Stanic (Rodenbücher 86.), Rósa, B. Tóth (D. Kulcsár 79.) – Heinz. Coach: László Prukner.
Paksi SE: A. Kovács – Sifter, Fiola, J. Szabó, Csehi – Bartha (Miskolczi 86.), T. Heffler, Sipeki (Palásthy 82.), Lisztes (T. Kiss 68.), Vayer – Montvai. Coach: Károly Kis.
G.: Heinz (10.), J. Szabó (33. - o.g.) – Bartha (8.)
Y.: Tutoric (31.), B. Tóth (38.), Csizmadia (68.) – Bartha (84.)

Kecskeméti TE: Holczer – Némedi, B. Balogh, Lambulic, I. Farkas – Litsingi, Ebala, Cukic (Dosso 75.), Savic (Csordás 80.) – Foxi (Wilson 80.), Tököli. Coach: István Urbányi.
Ferencvárosi TC: Ranilović – Csizmadia, Z. Balog, Tutoric, Junior – Andrezinho (B. Tóth 61.), Maróti, Stanic (Pisanjuk 86.), Rósa, D. Kulcsár (Abdi 75.) – Heinz. Coach: László Prukner.
G.: Tököli (45.) – Rósa (4.), Abdi (87.)
Y.: Ebala (41.), Cukic (70.) – Csizmadia (49.), Heinz (67.)

Ferencvárosi TC: Ranilović – Balog (Rodenbücher 59.), Csizmadia, Tutoric, Junior (Kulcsár 25.) – Maróti (Abdi 68.), Józsi, Stanic, Andrezinho – Rósa, Heinz. Coach: László Prukner.
Budapest Honvéd FC: Kemenes – Takács, Cséke, Botis, Hajdú – Coira, Akassou, Danilo (Bajner 76.), Sadjo (Conteh 70.) – Rouani (Abass 67.), Rufino. Coach: Massimo Morales.
G.: Kulcsár (51.) – Rufino (8.), Hajdú (13. - pen.), Rouani (33.)
Y.: Junior (12.), Csizmadia (43.), Heinz (79.) – Sadjo (23.)
R.: Stanic (40.)

Videoton FC: Tujvel – Lázár, Lipták, Horváth, Hidvégi – Sándor (Gosztonyi 85.), Vasiljevic (Polonkai 46.), Elek – Nagy, Alves, Vujovic (Nikolic 60.). Coach: György Mezey.
Ferencvárosi TC: Ranilović – Rodenbücher, Csizmadia, Junior – Schembri (Pölöskei 83.), Rósa, Maróti, Józsi, Tóth (Kulcsár 63.) – Andrezinho (Adriano 89.), Heinz. Coach: László Prukner.
G.: Nikolic (63.) – Andrezinho (22.)
Y.: Lipták (18.), Horváth (43.) – Tóth (34.), Maróti (44.), Andrezinho (72.)
R.: Rodenbücher (77.)

Ferencvárosi TC: Ranilović – Balog, Csizmadia, Junior (Pölöskey 86.) – Rósa, Maróti, Józsi, Tóth (Jakimovski 81.) – Schembri, Heinz, Andrezinho (Adriano 68.). Coach: László Prukner.
Győri ETO FC: Stevanovic – Völgyi, Fehér, Babic, Szabó – Ji-Paraná (Kiss 70.), Tokody, Ganugrava, Trajkovic (Aleksidze 55.), Eugene (Koltai 25.) – Bouguerra. Coach: Attila Pintér.
G.: Heinz (1., 17.), Schembri (47.)
Y.: Rósa (67.) – Eugene (9.), Völgyi (25.), Stevanovic (67.), Ji-Paraná (67.), Fehér (78.)

Újpest FC: Balajcza – Szokol (Kiss 66.), Vermes, Takács, Pollák – Böőr (Simek 63.), Egerszegi, Mitrovic, Simon (Matos 90.) – Tisza, Rajczi. Coach: Géza Mészöly.
Ferencvárosi TC: Ranilović – Balog, Csizmadia, Junior – Andrezinho (Stanic 58.), Maróti (Adriano 85.), Rósa, Józsi, Tóth (Kulcsár 70.) – Schembri, Heinz. Coach: László Prukner.
G.: Simon (28.), Tisza (43., 93.), Rajczi (56., 72.), Mitrovic (61.)
Y.: Böőr (18.), Takács (40.), Rajczi (56.) – Balog (43.)
R.: Heinz (40.)

Ferencvárosi TC: Ranilović – Balog, Csizmadia, Junior – Andrezinho, Maróti, Tóth (Pölöskey 65.), Józsi (Rodenbücher 46.), Rósa – Abdi (Kulcsár 65.), Schembri. Coach: László Prukner.
BFC Siófok: Molnár – Mogyorósi, Graszl, Fehér, Novák – Lukács (Piller 87.), Kecskés (Ludánszki 60.), Tusori, Ivancsics (Ribeiro 66.) – Homma, Sowunmi. Coach: István Mihalecz.
G.: Schembri (71.) – Homma (41.), Sowunmi (69.)
Y.: Rósa (81.), Junior (92.) – Sowunmi (19.), Kecskés (23.)

Vasas SC: Végh – Balog, Arnaut (Loussaief 20.), Kovács, Gáspár, Katona (Phantkhava 69.) – Benounes, Pavicevic, Bakos (Lázok 46.), Németh – Ferenczi. Coach: Giovanni Dellacasa.
Ferencvárosi TC: Ranilović – Rodenbücher, Csizmadia, Balog, Junior (Adriano 54.) – Schembri, Rósa, Maróti, Stanic, Andrezinho – Miljkovic (Józsi 72.). Coach: László Prukner.
G.: Lázok (52.) – Schembri (21., 30., 53.)
Y.: Pavicevic (23.) – Schambri (31.), Miljkovic (46.), Maróti (63.)

Ferencvárosi TC: Ranilović – Adriano, Balog, Csizmadia, Rodenbücher – Andrezinho, Maróti, Stanic (Tóth 64.) – Rósa (Józsi 13.), Schembri, Miljkovic (Abdi 79.). Coach: László Prukner.
MTK Budapest FC: Szatmári – Vukadinovic, Szekeres, Sütő, Vadnai (Ladányi 46.) – Szabó (Könyves 60.), Gál, Kanta, Pátkai, A. Pál – Tischler (Eppel 84.). Coach: József Garami.
G.: Sütő (8. - o.g., 25. - o.g.), Csizmadia (84.)
Y.: Stanic (55.), Rodenbücher (78.) – Vadnai (23.), Pátkai (50.)

Ferencvárosi TC: Ranilović – Balog, Csizmadia, Rodenbücher, Adriano – Andrezinho (Józsi 80.), Maróti, Rósa, Stanic (Tóth 71.), Schembri – Miljkovic (Heinz 57.). Coach: László Prukner.
Kaposvári Rákóczi FC: Kovács – Grúz (Balázs 69.), Okuka, Zahorecz, Zsók – Gujic, Pavlovic, Pedro, Jawad (Godslove 81.) – Oláh, Peric (Kulcsár 62.). Coach: Tibor Sisa.
G.: Rósa (44. - pen.)
Y.: Andrezinho (33.), Rodenbücher (52.), Maróti (66.) – Zsók (14.), Okuka (33.), Oláh (36.), Grúz (40.), Zahorecz (78.), Kulcsár (81.)
R.: Maróti (75.) – Zahorecz (89.)

Debreceni VSC: Malinauskas – Nagy, Simac, Mijadinoski, Fodor – Czvitkovics, Bódi (Dombi 78.), Varga, Szakály (Coulibaly 74.) – Kabát, Yannick (Kiss 66.). Coach: András Herczeg.
Ferencvárosi TC: Ranilović – Adriano (Miljkovic 64.), Csizmadia, BAlog (Stockley 81.), Rodenbücher – Andrezinho, Józsi (Tóth 71.), Stanic, Rósa – Heinz, Schembri. Coach: László Prukner.
G.: Kabát (5. - pen.), Czvitkovics (88.) – Rodenbücher (75.)
Y.: Kabát (15.) – Rósa (30.), Schembri (50.)
R.: Kabát (58.)

Ferencvárosi TC: Haber – Adriano, Csizmadia, Rodenbücher – Rósa (Stanic 76.), Maróti, Józsi (Tóth 56.), Andrezinho – Schembri (Morales 67.), Heinz, Miljkovic. Coach: László Prukner.
Szolnoki MÁV FC: Rézsó – Cornaci, Stanisic, Pető, Balogh – Remili, Molnár, Koós (Tchami 70.), Szalai, Vörös (Antal 78.) – Pisanjuk (Ngalle 66.). Coach: Antal Simon.
G.: Rodenbücher (63.)
Y.: Schembri (19.) – Stanisic (38.)
R.: Stanisic (90.)

Zalaegerszegi TE: Vlaszák – Kocsárdi, Miljatovic, Varga, Panikvar – Szalai, Kamber, Illés (Horváth 59.), Balázs – Rajcomar (Delic 68.), Simon (Turcsik 83.). Coach: János Csank.
Ferencvárosi TC: Haber – Balog (Adriano 34.), Csizmadia, Rodenbücher – Maróti, Rósa (Stanic 80.), Józsi, Andrezinho – Schembri, Heinz, Miljikovic (Abdi 53.). Coach: László Prukner.
G.: Balázs (4.), Delic (89. - pen.) – Rósa (64.)
Y.: Panikvar (26.), Kamber (59.), Horváth (90.), Varga (94.) – Miljikovic (21.), Csizmadia (67.), Maróti (88.)

Ferencvárosi TC: Ranilović – Csizmadia, Dragóner (Adriano 46.), Rodenbücher – Rósa, Maróti, Józsi (Tóth 83.), Stanic (Morales 37.), Andrezinho – Schembri, Heinz. Coach: László Prukner.
Szombathelyi Haladás: Rózsa – Schimmer, Guzmics, Devecseri (Fodrek 66.), Tóth – Nagy, Korolovszky, Á. Simon, Sipos (Csontos 60.) – Kenesei, Oross. Coach: Zoltán Aczél.
G.: Heinz (40.), Maróti (62.) – Kenesei (84.)
Y.: Maróti (52.) – Kenesei (9.), Nagy (42.), Oross (55.)
R.: Kenesei (93.)

Lombard-Pápa TFC: Szűcs – G. Tóth, Farkas, Supic, Németh – Rebryk, Gyömbér, Bárányos, N. Tóth (Palkó 65.) – Abwo (Quintero 55.), Maric (Jovánczai 13.). Coach: György Véber.
Ferencvárosi TC: Haber – Balog, Csizmadia, Rodenbücher – Rósa, Józsi, Maróti, Andrezinho (Dragóner 83.) – Schembri (Tóth 77.), Heinz, Miljkovic (Morales 67.). Coach: László Prukner.
G.: Schembri (18., 27., 76.), Heinz (40.), Morales (75.)
Y.: Bárányos (28.), Németh (85.) – Andrezinho (6.), Rodenbücher (9.), Csizmadia (80.), Tóth (88.)

Paksi SE: Csernyánszki – Heffler, Éger, Fiola, Csehi – Bartha (Szabó 73.), Böde, Sifter, Sipeki – Kiss (Montvai 67.), Vayer (Magasföldi 90.). Coach: Károly Kis.
Ferencvárosi TC: Haber – Balog, Dragóner, Rodenbücher – Rósa, Maróti, Józsi (Morales 74.), Andrezinho – Schembri, Heinz, Miljkovic. Coach: László Prukner.
G.: Vayer (47.), Böde (78.), Montvai (85.) – Maróti (54.), Miljkovic (84.)
Y.: Éger (40.)

Ferencvárosi TC: Ranilović – Balog, Csizmadia, Tutoric – Stanic (Tóth 67.), Rósa, Maróti, Heinz, Józsi (Andrezinho 77.) – Schembri, Morales (Miljkovic 85.). Coach: László Prukner.
Kecskeméti TE: Rybánsky – Gyagya, Radanovic (Preklet 46.), Balogh, Mohl – Savic, Alempijevic, Litsingi (Bertus 76.) – Bori, Tököli, Foxi (Vujovic 60.). Coach: Tomislav Sivic.
G.: Preklet (50. - o.g.), Rósa (86. - pen.) – Tököli (38.)
Y.: Tutoric (6.) – Alempijevic (6.), Preklet (49.)

Budapest Honvéd FC: Tóth – Lovric, Debreceni, Botis, Hajdú – G. Nagy (Danilo 55.), Hidi (Zelenka 55.), Ivancsics, Akassou, Moreira (Vólent 68.) – Bright. Coach: Attila Supka.
Ferencvárosi TC: Ranilović – Csizmadia, Tutoric, Balog – Stanic, Maróti, Rósa, Józsi (Tóth 65.) – Schembri, Heinz (Andrezinho 83.), Miljkovic (Abdi 68.). Coach: László Prukner.
G.: Stanic (12.)
Y.: Botis (61.), Lovric (79.), Hajdú (88.), Zelenka (89.), Akassou (92.) – Ranilović (75.), Csizmadia (79.), Abdi (93.)

Ferencvárosi TC: Ranilović – Balog, Csizmadia, Tutoric – Andrezinho (Miljkovic 68.), Józsi (Tóth 46.), Maróti, Rósa, Stanic (Abdi 74.) – Heinz, Schembri. Coach: László Prukner.
Videoton FC Fehérvár: Bozovic – Andic, Lázár (Milanovic 76.), Lipták, Vaskó – Gosztonyi, Polonkai, Sándor, Vasiljevic (Szakály 70.) – Alves, Lencse (Nikolic 65.). Coach: György Mezey.
G.: Alves (26.), Vasiljevic (33.), Lencse (52.), Andic (67.), Polonkai (79.)
Y.: Rósa (4.), Balog (25.), Tóth (60.) – Polonkai (13.), Lipták (42.)

Győri ETO FC: Stevanovic – Takács, Djordjevic, Fehér, Völgyi – Dinjar (Dudás 70.), Kiss, Pilibaitis, Ji-Paraná – Aleksidze (Trajkovic 76.), Koltai (Bouguerra 76.). Coach: Aurél Csertői.
Ferencvárosi TC: Ranilović – Csizmadia, Tutoric, Dragóner, Rodenbücher – Rósa, Maróti (Stanic 52.), Andrezinho (Tóth 55.) – Schembri, Heinz, Morales (Abdi 68.). Coach: László Prukner.
G.: Aleksidze (50.)
Y.: Völgyi (42.), Koltai (48.), Pilibaitis (93.) – Maróti (34.)

Ferencvárosi TC: Ranilović – Csizmadia, Balog, Tutoric, Rodenbücher – Rósa, Stanic (Tóth 46.), Andrezinho (Józsi 68.) – Schembri, Heinz, Morales (Dragóner 76.). Coach: László Prukner.
Újpest FC: Balajcza – Szokol, Rubus, Takács, Pollák – Böőr (Lázár 71.), Mitrovic, Tajthy – Balajti (Barczi 77.), Ahjupera (Simek 82.), Rajczi. Coach: Géza Mészöly.
G.: Heinz (40.)
Y.: Andrezinho (44.), Rodenbücher (47.), Rósa (56.) – Rajczi (12.), Balajti (18.), Mitrovic (20.), Rubus (59.), Lázár (82.)

BFC Siófok: Molnár – Mogyorósi, Graszl, Fehér, Novák – Lukács (Csermelyi 87.), Tusori, Kecskés, Melczer – Homma (Csordás 70.), Délczeg. Coach: István Mihalecz.
Ferencvárosi TC: Ranilović – Csizmadia, Balog, Tutoric, Rodenbücher (Pölöskey 59.) – Tóth (Józsi 59.), Maróti, Heinz – Schembri, Miljkovic (Abdi 77.), Morales. Coach: László Prukner.
G.: Délczeg (19.) – Schembri (64.)
Y.: Kecskés (29.), Lukács (84.) – Schembri (13.), Tóth (32.), Heinz (48.)

Ferencvárosi TC: Haber – Csizmadia, Dragóner, Tutoric, Junior – Rósa, Maróti (Pölöskey 80.), Józsi (Miljkovic 66.) – Schembri, Heinz (Stanic 74.), Morales. Coach: László Prukner.
Vasas SC: G. Németh – Balog (Lázok 58.), Gáspár, Mileusnic, Katona – Kulcsár, Lisztes (N. Németh 75.), Kovács, Rezes – Szilágyi (Beliczky 77.), Ferenczi. Coach: András Komjáti.
G.: Maróti (78. - o.g.)
Y.: Dragóner (70.) – Mileusnic (5.), Rezes (14.), Kulcsár (68.), Kovács (74.), N. Németh (84.)

MTK Budapest FC: Szatmári – Vukadinovic, Szekeres, Kálnoki-Kis, Hajdú – Kanta, Vukmir, Könyves (Hrepka 78.), Wolfe (Ladányi 57.), A. Pál (Eppel 86.) – Tischler. Coach: József Garami.
Ferencvárosi TC: Haber – Balog, Csizmadia, Tutoric, Rodenbücher – Rósa (Junior 73.), Heinz, Maróti, Abdi (Tóth 79.) – Schembri (Miljkovic 75.), Morales. Coach: László Prukner.
G.: Könyves (65.) – Schembri (66., 72.), Maróti (86.)
Y.: Vukmir (24.), Hajdú (89.) – Maróti (60.), Miljkovic (83.)

Kaposvári Rákóczi FC: Kovács – Okuka, Zsók, Grúz, Gujic – Balázs, Hegedűs, Máté (Szepessy 63.), Pavlovic (Jawad 85.) – Oláh (Farkas 90.), Peric. Coach: Tibor Sisa.
Ferencvárosi TC: Haber – Balog, Csizmadia, Tutoric, Rodenbücher – Schembri, Morales (Stanic 75.), Heinz, Maróti, Rósa – Abdi (Miljkovic 89.). Coach: László Prukner.
G.: Oláh (63. - pen.), Zsók (90.) – Schembri (47.)
Y.: Okuka (18.), Gujic (21.), Zsók (25.), Pavlovic (63.) – Tutoric (20.), Rósa (83.)

Ferencvárosi TC: Haber – Csizmadia, Tutoric, Balog – Junior, Morales (Tóth 57.), Maróti (Józsi 19.), Rósa (Miljkovic 63.) – Schembri, Heinz, Abdi. Coach: László Prukner.
Debreceni VSC: Novakovic – Nagy, Simac, Mijadinoski, Fodor – Bódi (Dombi 84.), Ramos (Spitzmüller 78.), Varga, Szakály, Yannick (Farkas 92.) – Coulibaly. Coach: Elemér Kondás.
G.: Mijadinoski (84. - o.g.) – Coulibaly (56.)
Y.: Morales (28.), Balog (36.), Tóth (59.), Heinz (79.) – Szakály (33.), Coulibaly (40.), Bódi (76.), Ramos (77.), Dombi (90.)

Szolnoki MÁV FC: Melnichenko – Milicic (Lengyel 26.), Máté, Durovic, Vukomanovic – Fitos (Tchami 59.), Némedi, Jokic (Antal 83.), Búrány – Zsolnai, Gosic. Coach: Antal Simon.
Ferencvárosi TC: Haber – Balog, Csizmadia, Tutoric, Rodenbücher – Rósa (Józsi 70.), Stanic (Dragóner 81.), Júnior – Schembri, Pölöskey (Abdi 67.), Morales. Coach: László Prukner.
G.: Zsolnai (22., 45.) – Pölöskey (20.), Schembri (23.), Rósa (42. - pen.)
Y.: Gosic (26.), Durovic (41.), Lengyel (53.), Némedi (64.) – Rósa (60.), Júnior (79.), Morales (90.)

Ferencvárosi TC: Haber – Balog, Csizmadia, Tutoric, Rodenbücher (Józsi 28.) – Abdi (Heinz 54.), Stanic (Dragóner 84.), Morales, Júnior – Schembri, Pölöskey. Coach: László Prukner.
Zalaegerszegi TE: Vlaszák – Szalai (Kocsárdi 62.), Kovács, Bogunovic, Miljatovic, Panikvar – Simonfalvi (Rajcomar 80.), Kamber, Horváth (I. Delic 58.), Balázs – Turkovs. Coach: János Csank.
G.: Schembri (35., 83.), Pölöskey (55.), Heinz (75.) – Szalai (16.), Balázs (18.), Turkovs (28.), Kamber (39.)
Y.: Abdi (25.), Morales (69.), Csizmadia (74.), Pölöskey (89.) – Turkovs (29.), Kamber (42.), Szalai (60.), Simonfalvi (69.)

Szombathelyi Haladás: Rózsa – Schimmer, Guzmics, Nagy II, P. Tóth – Sipos (Molnár 81.), Nagy I (Sluka 79.), Á. Simon, Iszlai, Halmosi – Fodrek (A. Simon 86.). Coach: Zoltán Aczél.
Ferencvárosi TC: Ranilović – Balog, Csizmadia, Tutoric, Júnior – Rósa, Stanic, Józsi, Morales (Dragóner 87.), Schembri (Abdi 79.) – Pölöskey (Heinz 54.). Coach: László Prukner.
G.: Iszlai (51. - pen.) – Rósa (61.)
Y.: Fodrek (24.), Nagy II (30.), Rózsa (90.) – Tutoric (14.), Stanic (31.)
R.: Nagy II (77.) – Heinz (90.)

Ferencvárosi TC: Ranilović – Balog, Csizmadia, Tutoric, Júnior – Rósa, Maróti, Stanic (Dragóner 55.), Abdi – Schembri (Pölöskey 74.), Morales (Józsi 79.). Coach: László Prukner.
Lombard-Pápa TFC: Szűcs – Nagy, Dlusztus, Farkas, Tóth – Quintero, Bárányos, Supic (Venczel 74.), Zulevs – Bali (Varga 68.), Rebryk (Szabó 61.). Coach: György Véber.
G.: Schembri (45.), Morales (71.), Dragóner (89.)
Y.: Schembri (68.) – Rebryk (22.), Quintero (24.), Zulevs (32.)

Hungarian Cup

Third round

Újbuda TC: Petrovics – Lettrich (Suth 46.), Kun, Budai, T. Horváth – Laki, Székely, Kovács, Kövesdi – Nagy (Pleszkán 50.), Potemkin (Lókai 60.). Coach: Zoltán Kenyó.
Ferencvárosi TC: Mester – Rodenbücher, Adriano, Csizmadia, Junior (Stockley 46.) – Kulcsár, Maróti (Balog 46.), Tóth (Morales 60.), Stanic – Danquah, Miljkovic. Coach: László Prukner.
G.: Potemkin (30. - pen.) – Miljkovic (9., 20.), Stanic (43.), Danquah (49.), Laki (54. - o.g.), Balog (72.), Csizmadia (81.), Morales (83.)
Y.: Csizmadia (30.), Stockley (63.)

Fourth round

Rákospalotai EAC: Somogyi – Menyhárt, Tóth, Ferencz, Mészáros – Gulyás, Dancs (Dinka 65.), Cseri, Gáspár (Maczó 84.) – Olasz, Borsi (Szabó 53.). Coach: János Mátyus.
Ferencvárosi TC: Haber – Adriano (Fitos 72.), Csizmadia (Dragóner 65.), Rodenbücher – Tóth, Maróti, Rósa (Kulcsár 46.), Józsi – Morales, Heinz, Miljkovic. Coach: László Prukner.
G.: Morales (21.), Rósa (29.), Miljkovic (38., 55.), Józsi (61.)
Y.: Gulyás (14.)

Fifth round

First leg

BFC Siófok: Szalma – Márton, Ludánszki (Tusori 68.), Horváth, László (Lukács 85.) – Kocsis, Pécseli, Thiago, Piller – Csermelyi, Délczeg (Ivancsics 74.). Coach: István Mihalecz.
Ferencvárosi TC: Ranilović – Rodenbücher, Csizmadia, Junior (Andrezinho 46.) – Kulcsár, Józsi, Stanic, Tóth – Rósa, Heinz (Miljkovic 46.), Abdi (Morales 62.). Coach: László Prukner.
G.: László (7. - pen.), Csermelyi (45., 68.) – Andrezinho (90.+1)
Y.: Piller (90.) – Tóth (6.), Heinz (42.), Rodenbücher (78.), Stanic (87.)

Second leg

Ferencvárosi TC: Haber – Csizmadia, Tutoric, Balog – Rósa, Maróti, Andrezinho (Morales 46.), Józsi (Tóth 54.) - Schembri, Heinz (Abdi 54.), Miljkovic. Coach: László Prukner.
BFC Siófok: Molnár – Mogyorósi, Fehér, Graszl, Novák – Tusori, Lukács (Kecskés 77.), Ludánszki (Márton 88.), Délczeg (Horváth 88.) - Homma, Csermelyi. Coach: István Mihalecz.
G.: Tóth (55.), Schembri (61.) – Homma (51.)
Y.: Miljkovic (48.), Schembri (65.), Tutoric (71.), Morales (86.) – Fehér (14.), Mogyorósi (67.), Lukács (70.), Horváth (92.)

BFC Siófok won 4–3 on aggregate.

League Cup

Group stage

Lombard-Pápa TFC: L. Szűcs - G. Tóth, P. Bíró, Supic, A. Farkas (P. Takács 46.) – Zulevs (Quintero 57.), M. Mészáros, N. Heffler – Bárányos (Zs. Szabó 46.), Abwo (Jovánczai 46.), N. Tóth (Rebryk 46.). Coach: György Véber.
Ferencvárosi TC: Mester – Vattai, Fülöp, Rodenbücher, Sváb (R. Szabó 74.) – Pisanjuk, P. Nagy (Berdó 77.), M. Papp (Nyilasi 46.), Bölcsföldi (Peszmeg 64.) – Pölöskey, Trakys (I. Kovács 58.). Coach: László Prukner.
G.: —
Y.: Pisanjuk (30.), Sváb (73.)

Ferencvárosi TC: Mester – Fitos, Stockley, Fülöp, Vattai – Bölcsföldi (Veron 57.), Gárdos (Vass 71.), Jakimovski (Nagy 76.) – Morales (Danquah 41.), Pölöskey, Abdi (Garcia 76.). Coach: László Prukner.
Szombathelyi Haladás: Mursits – Rajos (Szvoboda 46.), Lengyel, Devecseri, Csontos (Szakály 59.) – Rácz (Hanzl 89.), Tóth, Obric (Iszlai 71.), Lattenstein (Gyurján 59.) – Simon, Fodrek. Coach: Zoltán Aczél.
G.: —
Y.: Jakimovski (14.), Vattai (27.) – Lengyel (50.), Tóth (58.), Devecseri (90.)

Szombathelyi Haladás: Rózsa – Korolovszky, II Nagy (Lattenstein 73.), Oross (Devecseri 84.), Tóth – Sipos, Kenesei, Guzmics (Lengyel 70.), Csontos (Á. Simon 46.) – Fodrek (Irhás 46.), Rajos. Coach: Zoltán Aczél.
Ferencvárosi TC: Jova – Sváb, Papp (Tóbiás 68.), Antal, Tóth – Fülöp, Vattai, Szabó (Gyürki 68.), Vass – Pölöskey, Peszmeg (Erdei 86.). Coach: Péter Lipcsei.
G.: Sipos (43.) – Pölöskey (93.)
Y.: Á. Simon (58.) – Papp (43.)

Ferencvárosi TC: Mester – Jakimovski (Bölcsföldi 52.), Fülöp, Tutoric (A. Tóth 46.), Gárdos – B. Tóth (Junior 46.), Vattai, Morales (Abdi 46.), Vass – Fitos, Kulcsár (Nyilasi 70.). Coach: László Prukner.
Lombard-Pápa TFC: Kovács – Tóth, Dlusztus (Karácsony 46.), Takács, Jovánczai – Gyömbér, Rajnay, Németh (Venczel 10.), Bíró – Fertea, Bali (Germán 46.). Coach: György Véber.
G.: Fitos (2.), B. Tóth (37.), Abdi (57.), Nyilasi (76.) – Dlusztus (40., 90.)
Y.: Dlusztus (36.), G. Tóth (45.), Rajnay (72.), Bíró (86.)

References

External links
 Eufo
 Official Website
 UEFA
 fixtures and results

2010-11
Hungarian football clubs 2010–11 season